Events in the year 1955 in Germany.

Incumbents
President –  Theodor Heuss 
Chancellor –  Konrad Adenauer

Events 

 May 15 - Rhineland-Palatinate state election, 1955
 June 24 - July 5 - 5th Berlin International Film Festival
 July 2 - Tierpark Berlin opened.
 July 15 - September 18 - documenta 1 in Kassel
 August 11 - 1955 Altensteig mid-air collision
 September 20 - Treaty on Relations between the USSR and the GDR

Births 
 4 January - Wolfgang Tiefensee, German politician
 14 January - Jan Fedder, German actor (died 2019)
 16 January - Martin Roth, German museum director  (died 2017)
 18 January - Gerburg Jahnke, German comedian
 25 January - Petra Gerster, German journalist
 1 February 
 Hans Werner Olm, German comedian
 Christian, Duke of Oldenburg, head of the Grand Ducal Family of Oldenburg
 10 February - Bernd Martin, German football player (died 2018)
 6 March - Friedbert Pflüger, German politician
 8 March - Thomas Bellut, German journalist
 11 March - Nina Hagen, German musician
 21 March - Bärbel Wöckel, German sprinter
 13 April - Ole von Beust, German politician
 29 April - Klaus Siebert, German biathlete (died 2016) 
 15 May - Claudia Roth, German politician
 15 May - Alexander Pusch, German fencer
 26 May - Doris Dörrie, German film director
 2 June - Heiko von der Leyen, German physician
 10 June - Annette Schavan, German politician
 11 June - Marie Gruber, German actress
 1 July - Rosemarie Wenner, German Methodist bishop
 29 July - Christian Tramitz, German actor, comedian, voice actor and author
 9 August - Udo Beyer, German track and field athlete
 15 August - Roger Willemsen, German author, essayist and TV presenter (died 2016)
 20 August - Helge Schneider, German comedian, jazz musician and multi-instrumentalist, author, film and theatre director, and actor
 25 August - Gerd Müller, German politician
 2 September - Claus Kleber, German journalist
 14 September - Wilhelm Huxhorn, German footballer (died 2010)
 20 September 
 Georg Christoph Biller, German choral conductor (died 2022)
 Lilo Wanders, German transvestite entertainer, comedian and theatre/television host
 22 September - Karl-Heinz Rummenigge, German football player and trainer
 25 September - Peter Müller, German politician
 25 September - Richy Müller, German actor
 30 September - Andy Bechtolsheim, German businessman
 11 October - Hans-Peter Briegel, German footballer
 25 October - Peter Nocke, German swimmer
 10 November - Roland Emmerich, German film director, screenwriter, and producer
 8 December - Martin Semmelrogge, German actor
 15 December - Renate Künast, German politician
 22 December - Thomas C. Südhof, German biochemist
 31 December - Gregor Braun, German cyclist

Deaths

 15 January — Johannes Baader, German architect, writer and artist (born 1875)
 24 January - Friedrich Wilhelm Kopsch, German anatomist (born 1868)
 20 February — Eugen Schmalenbach, German economist (born 1873)
 24 March - Otto Gessler, German politician (born 1875)
 18 April — Albert Einstein, German theoretical physicist (born 1879) 
 29 May - Rudolf Klein-Rogge, German actor (born 1885)
 29 June - Ernst Legal, German actor (born 1881)
 29 June — Max Pechstein, German painter (born 1881)
 2 August - Rupprecht, Crown Prince of Bavaria, German nobleman (born 1869)
 12 August — Thomas Mann, German author (born 1875)
 13 August — Wilhelm Kreis, German architect (born 1873)
 19 August - Otto Weiß, Luftwaffe officer (born 1907)
 25 August - Heinrich Spoerl, German author (born 1887)
 31 August:
 Willi Baumeister, German painter, scenic designer, art professor and typographer (born 1889)
 Eberhard Koebel, German youth leader and writer (born 1907)
 9 October — Joseph Vollmer, German engineer (born 1871)
 15 December —  Otto Braun, German politician (born 1872)
 19 December - Herbert von Dirksen, German diplomat (born 1882)

References

 
1950s in Germany
Years of the 20th century in Germany
Germany
Germany